NMW may refer to:

 National Minimum Wage Act 1998, UK
 National Museum Wales
 Naturhistorisches Museum, Vienna (Wien), Austria
 National Museum, Warsaw